Andøya is an island and neighborhood in the city of Kristiansand in Agder county, Norway.  The neighborhood is part of the district of Voie in the borough of Vågsbygd within the city.  The island is connected to the mainland via a short bridge.  The island is mostly villas, harbors and has a population around 1,000 (2014).

There are no schools or shops located at the island but there is a lot of businesses and offices at the island. Buses are available to Vågsbygd a few times a day.  The postal code for the island begins with 462* and the telephone area code is 38.

See also
List of islands of Norway

References

Geography of Kristiansand
Islands of Agder